Hollywood Park is the sixth studio album by American indie-rock band The Airborne Toxic Event. Released in 2020, the album follows the thematic arc of Mikel Jollett's memoir of the same name.

Track listing

References

2015 albums
The Airborne Toxic Event albums